CZ LOKO Aréna is an indoor sporting arena located in Jihlava, Czech Republic. The capacity of the arena is 7,504 people and was built in 1956. It is currently home to the HC Dukla Jihlava ice hockey team.

Indoor ice hockey venues in the Czech Republic
Buildings and structures in Jihlava
1955 establishments in Czechoslovakia
Sports venues completed in 1955
20th-century architecture in the Czech Republic